Federal State Unitary Enterprise Satellite Communications or Russian Satellite Communications Company is the main state operator of communications satellites. It is the Russian operator for the international satellite communications systems Intelsat, Eutelsat and Intersputnik, cooperating with these organizations and handling international account settlements.

As the national satellite operator, RSCC meets the important state tasks on providing mobile presidential and governmental communications, federal TV and Radio signal transmission over the territory of Russia and the most countries of the world.

History 
The company´s roots date back to February 1968 when the USSR Ministry of Communications created “Union Hub No. 9 for Radio Broadcasting and Radio Communications”. On 19 April 2001, the company became a federal unitary enterprise.

Assets 
The RSCC, an arm of the Ministry of Communications and Mass Media, is the leading Russian satellite communications operator. The company possesses the largest satellite constellation in Russia located in the geostationary orbital arc from 14° West to 140° East and cover the whole territory of Russia, the Commonwealth of Independent States (CIS), Europe, the Middle East, Africa, the Asia-Pacific region, North and South America, and Australia.

The company owns teleports located in Medvezhy Ozera, Vladimir, Dubna Skolkovo, Zheleznogorsk, Khabarovsk and the Shabolovka Technical Center in Moscow which ensure the transmission of channels to all five time zones in Russia via the space vehicles of RTRN, as well as its own high-speed optical-fiber digital network.

References

External links 
 Official website 

Communications satellite operators
Companies based in Moscow
Telecommunications companies of Russia
Federal State Unitary Enterprises of Russia